was a Japanese football player and manager. He played for Japan national team.

Club career
Ohashi was born in Hiroshima Prefecture on April 21, 1934. After graduating from Waseda University, he played for Yuasa Batteries and his local club Toyo Industries. In 1965, Toyo Industries joined new league Japan Soccer League. He retired in 1967. He played 3 games and the club also won the championship for 3 years in a row (1965-1967) in the league.

National team career
In May 1958, Ohashi was selected Japan national team for 1958 Asian Games. At this competition, on May 26, he debuted against Philippines.

Coaching career
After retirement, in 1971, Ohashi became a manager for Toyo Industries as Yukio Shimomura successor. He managed the club until 1975.

Ohashi died on December 21, 2015 at the age of 80.

Club statistics

National team statistics

References

External links
 
 Japan National Football Team Database

1934 births
2015 deaths
Waseda University alumni
Association football people from Hiroshima Prefecture
Japanese footballers
Japan international footballers
Japan Soccer League players
Sanfrecce Hiroshima players
Footballers at the 1958 Asian Games
Japanese football managers
Association football forwards
Asian Games competitors for Japan